Coleophora argentialbella is a moth of the family Coleophoridae. It is found in the United States, including Kentucky and Oklahoma.

References

argentialbella
Moths described in 1874
Moths of North America